Brownell Block, also known as the Senger Dry Goods Company Building, is a historic commercial building located at Peru, Miami County, Indiana.  It was built in 1883–1884, as a three-story, Italianate style brick building faced with a molded stone veneer.  The rectangular building measures 66 feet, 6 inches, by 132 feet.  It has a two-story addition and features projecting bays on the second and third floors.  The building was home to Senger Dry Goods Company for 70 years. It houses the Miami County Museum.

It was listed on the National Register of Historic Places in 1983.

References

External links
Miami County Museum website

History museums in Indiana
Commercial buildings on the National Register of Historic Places in Indiana
Italianate architecture in Indiana
Commercial buildings completed in 1884
Buildings and structures in Miami County, Indiana
National Register of Historic Places in Miami County, Indiana